Tsang Kin Fong (born 2 January 1993 in Hong Kong), is a former Hong Kong professional footballer. 

His elder brother, Tsang Chi Hau, is also a former professional footballer.

Club career
Tsang was one of the Kitchee's youth team player, who won the champion of U-15 group. He had his secondary school life at Lam Tai Fai College. He represented the college in the HKSSF football section. He had also transferred to Shatin, which is led by Lam Tai Fai, helping Shatin to win the 2008/09 Hong Kong Second Division League. He finally got his first chance to play in the Hong Kong First Division. He played his first Hong Kong First Division League match during match against South China.

Shatin placed ninth out of ten teams, which was relegated to the Hong Kong Second Division League. Therefore, Tsang decided to join Kitchee, playing with his elder brother again since they are playing at their father's club. In the summer of 2011, Tsang, with his elder brother, were loaned to Hong Kong Sapling.

On 8 July 2019, Tsang returned to Hong Kong, signing a contract with Pegasus.

Career statistics

Club
As of 12 September 2011

References

External links
 
 Tsang Kin Fong at HKFA

1993 births
Living people
Association football forwards
Hong Kong footballers
Hong Kong expatriate footballers
Expatriate footballers in Sweden
Hong Kong First Division League players
Hong Kong Premier League players
Sun Hei SC players
Dreams Sports Club players
Shatin SA players
Kitchee SC players
R&F (Hong Kong) players
TSW Pegasus FC players